Håkan Zahr (16 April 1948 – 4 October 2015) was a Swedish tennis player.

Tennis career
Zahr won the Swedish National Championships in 1969 and 1970 and represented Sweden in one Davis Cup tie, the 1971 first round Europe Zone A tie against France.

Zahr participated in three Grand Slam events, the 1966 Australian Open and the French Open and US Open in 1970.

See also
List of Sweden Davis Cup team representatives

References

External links
 
 

1948 births
2015 deaths
Swedish male tennis players